Willing may refer to:
 pertaining to Will (disambiguation)
 assigning items through a will and testament
 assenting through Volition (psychology)

Places
 Willing, New York, a town in Allegany County 
 Mount Willing (disambiguation)
 Willing Lake, a lake in Rice County, Minnesota, United States

People with the surname
 Ann Willing Bingham (1764–1801) born Anne Willing, American socialite
 Ava Lowle Willing, American socialite
 Charles Willing (1710–1754), English-American colonial merchant
 Elizabeth Willing Powel (1743–1830), born Elizabeth Willing, American socialite
 Foy Willing (1914–1978), American singer-songwriter
 George M. Willing (1829–1874), American physician
 James Willing, representative of the Continental Congress
 Jennie Fowler Willing (1834-1916), Canadian-American educator, author, preacher, social reformer, suffragist
 Martina Willing, German paralympian
 Mary Willing Byrd (1740–1814) born Mary Willing, American colonial socialite
 Mary Willing Clymer (1774–1852) born Mary Willing, American socialite
 Nick Willing, British director
 Oscar Willing (1889–1962), American golfer
 Thomas Willing (1731–1821), American financier
 Victor Willing (1928–1988), British painter
 Georg Franz-Willing (1915–2008), German historian
 Charles Willing Byrd (1770–1828), American politician
 G. Willing Pepper (1909–2001), American businessman

Other uses
 Willing Expedition, a 1778 military expedition
 
 "Willing", a song by Times of Grace from The Hymn of a Broken Man

See also
 
 Will (disambiguation)

English-language surnames
German-language surnames